Ryusei Okamoto (born 1 November 1993) is a Japanese handball player for Toyota Auto Body and the Japanese national team.

He represented Japan at the 2019 World Men's Handball Championship.

References

1993 births
Living people
Japanese male handball players
Chubu University alumni